The Imperial Naval Office was a government agency of the German Empire. It was established in April 1889, when the German Imperial Admiralty was abolished and its duties divided among three new entities: the Imperial Naval High Command (Kaiserliches Oberkommando der Marine), the Imperial Naval Cabinet (Kaiserliches Marinekabinett) and the Imperial Naval Office performing the functions of a ministry for the Imperial German Navy.

Structure and tasks

According to the 1871 Constitution of the German Empire, the federal states were responsible for the German land forces and the imperial government for the navy. So while there were Prussian, Bavarian, Saxon and Württemberg armies, there was a single Imperial Navy, the only formation under the direct authority of the German Reich beside the colonial Schutztruppe forces.

The head of the Naval Office was a Secretary of State who reported directly to the Imperial Chancellor (Reichskanzler). While the operational management of the Navy was the responsibility of the Imperial Naval High Command and under the direct command of Emperor Wilhelm II from 1899, the tasks of the Office were mainly administrative, such as planning naval construction and maintenance programs, directing the procurement of naval supplies, and advising the Reichstag parliament on naval matters. It also ran the Imperial shipyards in Danzig, Kiel and Wilhelmshaven, several educational institutions, and the Seewarte meteorological institute in Hamburg.

History

When in 1897 Konteradmiral Alfred von Tirpitz succeeded State Secretary Friedrich von Hollmann, who had resigned in a dispute on the naval budget, he made the Naval Office the power base in his campaign to build a great German High Seas Fleet to encounter Britain's Royal Navy. According to the theories of US admiral Alfred Thayer Mahan and his book The Influence of Sea Power upon History, the "Tirpitz Plan" was established jointly with Foreign State Secretary Bernhard von Bülow and, in interaction with the British Naval Defence Act 1889, fuelled the Anglo-German naval arms race. Tirpitz had urged for the dissolution of the Imperial Naval High Command in 1899, which gave him even more power but proved as fatal in World War I.

In 1898, the Naval Office also took over the administration of the Chinese Kiautschou Bay territory. During World War I, it gave out the casualty list of the Imperial Navy. State Secretary Tirpitz finally resigned in 1916, when Chancellor Theobald von Bethmann Hollweg strove for a balance with the British and Tirpitz' requests for full powers as fleet commander modelled on a First Sea Lord were denied.

After the war, the Imperial Naval Office was disestablished on 15 July 1919, when by decree of Reich President Friedrich Ebert its responsibilities were assigned to the Admiralty Staff, which was transformed into the Marineleitung agency of the German Reichswehr Ministry in 1920.

State Secretaries 

Karl Eduard Heusner 1 April 1889 - 23 April 1890
Friedrich von Hollmann 23 April 1890 - 1897
Alfred von Tirpitz 18 June 1897 - 15 March 1916
Eduard von Capelle 15 March 1916 – September 1918
Paul Behncke September 1918 – 5 October 1918
Ernst Ritter von Mann Edler von Tiechler 5 October 1918 – 13 February 1919
Maximilian Rogge, acting head official since December 1918, 13 February 1919 – 15 July 1919

References

Imperial German Navy